Soulschool is the debut studio album by American contemporary R&B singer Monteco, released September 12, 1995 via MCA Records. It did not chart in the United States; however, the lead single "Is It Me?" peaked at #32 on the Billboard R&B chart.

Track listing

Samples

References

External links
 
 

1995 debut albums
Albums produced by Chris Stokes (director)
MCA Records albums
Monteco albums